The Schmidtler Enduro is a German ultralight trike that was designed and produced by Ultraleichtflug Schmidtler of Munich. When it was available the aircraft was supplied as a complete ready-to-fly-aircraft.

The aircraft is no longer listed on the company website and presumed to be out of production.

Design and development
It features a cable-braced hang glider-style high-wing, weight-shift controls, a two-seats-in-tandem open cockpit with an optional cockpit fairing, tricycle landing gear with optional wheel pants and a single engine in pusher configuration.

The aircraft is made from bolted-together aluminum tubing, with its double surface wing covered in Dacron sailcloth. Its  span Air Creation wing is supported by a single tube-type kingpost and uses an "A" frame weight-shift control bar. The powerplant is a twin cylinder, liquid-cooled, two-stroke, dual-ignition  Rotax 582 engine or a twin cylinder, air-cooled, four-stroke,  BMW 1100 motorcycle engine.

Operational history
The Enduro XC model was used to set several microlight class world records for speed and altitude.

Variants
Enduro BMW
Model equipped with a  BMW 1100 motorcycle engine and no cockpit fairing.
Enduro XC
Model equipped with a  Rotax 582 aircraft engine or an optional  BMW 1100 motorcycle engine and a full cockpit fairing.

Specifications (Enduro BMW)

References

External links

Photo of a Schmidtler Enduro
Photo of a Schmidtler Enduro XC

2000s German sport aircraft
2000s German ultralight aircraft
Single-engined pusher aircraft
Ultralight trikes